Faouzi Ghoulam (; born 1 February 1991) is a professional footballer who plays as a left-back for  club Angers.

Born in France, Ghoulam is a former Algeria international, scoring five goals in 37 appearances for the national team from 2013 to 2017.

Early life 
Ghoulam was born in Saint-Priest-en-Jarez to Algerian parents. His father is from Batna, while his mother is from Annaba. He has eight brothers and two sisters, and his brother Nabil is a cross country runner that represented France at the 2004 IAAF World Cross Country Championships.

Club career
On 22 September 2010, Ghoulam made his professional debut for AS Saint-Étienne coming as a substitute in the 82nd minute of a Coupe de la Ligue match against Nice. He made his Ligue 1 debut in a round 13 clash against Valenciennes and went on to make another 11 appearances in his breakout season with Saint-Etienne, becoming a consistent starter by the end of the season. Over the next two and a half seasons, he made another 65 league appearances.

In the winter of 2014, Ghoulam moved to S.S.C. Napoli. He became an immediate starter at Napoli under Rafael Benítez and helped the side finish in third place in Serie A during the 2013–14 season, also capturing the Coppa Italia.

In November 2017, Ghoulam suffered an anterior cruciate ligament rupture in a Champions League group-stage fixture against Manchester City, and was expected to be ruled out for at least two months; in January 2018, however, he underwent medical tests and resumed training ahead of schedule.

On 31 January 2023, Ghoulam joined Angers in Ligue 1 as a free agent until the end of the 2022–23 season.

International career

On 18 December 2010, in an interview Algerian newspaper Le Buteur, Ghoulam said that his intentions were to represent Algeria in international competition despite being born in France. On 5 May 2011, Algerian under-23 coach Azzedine Aït Djoudi announced that Ghoulam was hesitant about joining the team, despite the fact that he was the one who contacted the Algerian Football Federation. On 6 October 2011, after being called up to the preliminary squad of the France under-21 team, Ghoulam said that he would be really proud to play for the team.

On 23 November 2012, in an interview following a league game against Valenciennes, Ghoulam announced that he was going to represent Algeria at the 2013 Africa Cup of Nations. A few days later, the Algerian Football Federation confirmed the information through a press release on its website. Ghoulam was selected in the Algeria squad for the 2013 Africa Cup of Nations in South Africa but he did not participate in any games. On 26 March 2013, Ghoulam made his debut as a starter in a 3–1 win over Benin in the 2014 FIFA World Cup qualifiers, providing the assist on the first Algerian goal.

Ghoulam represented Algeria at the 2014 World Cup finals as les Fennecs reached the round of 16, where they were beaten by eventual champions Germany after extra time. He started in both the match against Germany and the 2–1 group stage loss to Belgium.

In Algeria's opening match of the 2015 Africa Cup of Nations, Ghoulam scored his first international goal to give the team a 2–1 lead in an eventual 3–1 victory over South Africa.

Career statistics

Club

International goals
Scores and results list Algeria's goal tally first, score column indicates score after each Ghoulam goal.

Honours
Saint-Étienne
Coupe de la Ligue: 2013

Napoli
Coppa Italia: 2013–14, 2019–20
Supercoppa Italiana: 2014

Individual
UEFA Europa League Squad of the Season: 2014–15
Algerian Footballer of the Year: 2017
France Football Africa Team of the Year: 2017

References

External links
 Club profile
 
 
 
 

1991 births
French people of Algerian-Berber descent
People from Saint-Priest-en-Jarez
Sportspeople from Loire (department)
Footballers from Auvergne-Rhône-Alpes
Living people
Association football fullbacks
French footballers
France under-21 international footballers
Algerian footballers
Algeria international footballers
AS Saint-Étienne players
S.S.C. Napoli players
Angers SCO players
Ligue 1 players
Serie A players
2013 Africa Cup of Nations players
2014 FIFA World Cup players
2015 Africa Cup of Nations players
2017 Africa Cup of Nations players
Algerian expatriate footballers
Expatriate footballers in Italy
Algerian expatriate sportspeople in Italy